The 2021–22 season is the 50th season in the existence of HNK Šibenik and the 16th consecutive season in the top flight of Croatian football. In addition to the domestic league, HNK Šibenik participated in this season's edition of the Croatian Cup.

Players

First-team squad

Transfers

Pre-season and friendlies

Competitions

Overall record

Prva HNL

League table

Results summary

Results by round

Matches
The league fixtures were announced on 8 June 2021.

Croatian Cup

References

Šibenik
HNK Šibenik seasons